Dragonslayer is a novel by Wayland Drew published in 1981.

Plot summary
Dragonslayer is a novelization of the film Dragonslayer.

Reception
David St. Marie reviewed Dragonslayer in Ares Magazine #9 and commented that "I found Dragonslayer to be a solid novel, overall. It has failings, but most of those symptomatic of novels based on scripts have been avoided."

Reviews
Review by Jeff Frane (1981) in Locus, #244 May 1981 
Review by Chris Henderson (1981) in Dragon Magazine, #52, August 1981 
Review by Chris Henderson (1982) in Whispers #15-16, March 1982

References

1981 novels